Baita (pl. baite) is a term used mainly in Italy and France to refer to small dwellings of the central and western Alps. This word is found from the Lepontine to the Maritime alpine sections.

Description
Baite are huts usually constructed with dry-stone walls, although wood may also be used, and are typically roofed with substantial stone slabs known as piodi (lose in Western Alps) which provide protection from heavy winter snowfalls. A wood and stone baita of the Val di Susa – for instance in the hamlet of Rhuilles – and Hautes-Alpes is usually called grange. Sometimes the term improperly refers to modern and "rustic-chic" chalets.

Baite are often clustered together in Alpine pastures where they are occupied seasonally by herders tending sheep, cattle or goats during the summer (transhumance). In recent years abandoned baite, restored with varying degrees of respect, have also become popular as second homes and, to an extent, as holiday homes.

References
Scialpinismo in Valtellina – Glossario

See also

Chalet
Mountain hut
Vernacular architecture

Alps
Apennine Mountains
House types
Architecture in Italy
Stone houses
Transhumance
Vernacular architecture